Jupiter LXI, provisionally known as , is a natural satellite of Jupiter. It was discovered by a team of astronomers led by Brett J. Gladman, et al. in 2003.

 is about 2 kilometres in diameter, and orbits Jupiter at an average distance of 22,709 Mm in 699.125 days, at an inclination of 165° to the ecliptic (164° to Jupiter's equator), in a retrograde direction and with an eccentricity of 0.1961.

It belongs to the Carme group, made up of irregular retrograde moons orbiting Jupiter at a distance ranging between 23 and 24 Gm and at an inclination of about 165°.

This moon was lost following its discovery in 2003. It was recovered in 2018 and given its permanent designation that year.

References 

Carme group
Moons of Jupiter
Irregular satellites
Astronomical objects discovered in 2003
Moons with a retrograde orbit